George Clyde Stanway (23 June 1886 – 6 June 1968) was a former Australian rules footballer who played with Melbourne in the Victorian Football League (VFL).

Notes

External links 

1886 births
Australian rules footballers from Melbourne
Melbourne Football Club players
1968 deaths
People from Fitzroy, Victoria